Lepidodiscus is an extinct genus of prehistoric echinoderms in the class Edrioasteroidea.

References 

 Lepidodiscus at fossilworks

Edrioasteroidea
Prehistoric Crinozoa genera